The 1969 European Amateur Boxing Championships  were held in Bucharest, Romania from 30 May to 8 June. The 18th edition of the bi-annual competition was organised by the European governing body for amateur boxing, EABA. There were 180 fighters from 25 countries participating.

The Light Flyweight (– 48 kilograms) category was contested for the first time.

Medal winners

Medal table

External links
Results
Amateur Boxing

European Amateur Boxing Championships
Boxing
European Amateur Boxing Championships
Boxing
European Amateur Boxing Championships
European Amateur Boxing Championships
Sports competitions in Bucharest
1960s in Bucharest